Donn Lewin (April 1, 1926 – December 18, 2010) was an American professional wrestler, marine and tropical fish breeder.

Early life
Lewin was born on April 1, 1926, and grew up in Buffalo, New York, where he attended Lafayette High School.

Military career
Lewin left school at age 15 to join the Marines and serve in World War II. He fought at Iwo Jima, Guadalcanal, and Guam, and left the Marines after attaining the rank of Admiral's orderly. During his time in the service, he earned three Purple Hearts for wounds suffered in battle. After leaving the Marines, Lewin became interested in bodybuilding, and he placed second in a Mr. Niagara Frontier Contest.

Professional wrestling career
His placement in the bodybuilding contest brought him to the attention of Ed Don George, a promoter. George introduced him to Jim Henry, who trained Lewin. At the beginning of his wrestling career, Lewin competed in Buffalo, New York and across the border in Ontario, as well as Capitol Wrestling. While competing for Capitol Wrestling in Maryland, he teamed with his real-life brother Mark Lewin to win the American Tag Team Championship. Lewin also competed in California, Ohio, and Georgia. In Georgia, he teamed with his brother Mark again to win the Georgia version of the NWA International Tag Team Championship.

In 1969, a promoter asked Lewin to begin wearing a mask and competing as The Executioner. He used the identity while competing in several promotions. During that time period, Lewin also helped train Greg Valentine as a professional wrestler.

In addition to wrestling, Lewin also worked as a fish breeder for several years. Eventually, he decided to retire from wrestling and focus on his second career, which had grown to include not only pet fish, but also piranhas and alligators.

Personal life
Lewin's brothers Mark and Ted also became professional wrestlers. He also has a sister named Sallee. Sallee began dating professional wrestler Danny McShain shortly after McShain broke Lewin's nose; the couple was later married and were together until McShain's death in 1992. Due to wrestling, he required more than 30 operations throughout his life, including several hip replacements.

Death
Lewin died on December 18, 2010, at the age of 84 in Hawaii.

Championships and accomplishments
Capitol Wrestling
American Tag Team Championship (2 times) - with Mark Lewin
Georgia Championship Wrestling
NWA International Tag Team Championship (Georgia version) (1 time) - with Mark Lewin

See also

 List of Jewish professional wrestlers

References

1926 births
2010 deaths
20th-century American Jews
20th-century professional wrestlers
21st-century American Jews
American male professional wrestlers
United States Marines
Sportspeople from Buffalo, New York
Professional wrestlers from New York (state)
Jewish American sportspeople
Jewish professional wrestlers
Lafayette High School (Buffalo, New York) alumni
United States Marine Corps personnel of World War II